Etienne Vaessen (born 26 July 1995) is a Dutch professional footballer who plays as a goalkeeper for RKC Waalwijk in the Eredivisie.

Club career
He made his professional debut in the Eerste Divisie for RKC Waalwijk on 12 August 2016 in a game against FC Emmen. There, he came on as a substitute in the 22nd minute for the injured Tamati Williams.

On 28 May 2019, Vaessen won promotion to the Eredivisie with RKC after a season finale showdown against Go Ahead Eagles, which ended in a 4–5 win.

Personal life
While working as a guard for MediaMarkt and playing amateur football in 2014, Vaessen was stabbed while chasing a shoplifter, leaving him hospitalised for days.

References

External links
 

1995 births
Footballers from Breda
Living people
Dutch footballers
Association football goalkeepers
RKC Waalwijk players
Eredivisie players
Eerste Divisie players